WHIO (1290 kHz) – branded AM 1290 and News 95.7 WHIO – is a commercial talk AM radio station licensed to serve Dayton, Ohio and covering the Dayton metropolitan area. Owned by Cox Media Group, the WHIO studios are located at the Cox Media Center building in Dayton, while the transmitter is located in nearby Kettering. In addition to a standard analog transmission, WHIO is simulcast full-time on WHIO-FM (95.7) and is available online.

History
WHIO was Cox Radio's first station started by company founder Ohio Governor James M. Cox in the Dayton Daily News building downtown, on Ludlow Street.  It signed on the air on February 9, 1935.  To create a new radio service in Dayton, Cox had to purchase WLBW in Oil City, Pennsylvania, from the Petroleum Telephone Company. Cox shut down that operation and moved the radio station to Dayton. The station first broadcast at a power of 1,000 watts on 1260 kHz, which had been the frequency of WLBW. With the enactment of the North American Regional Broadcasting Agreement (NARBA) in 1941, WHIO moved to its current frequency at 1290 kHz.  90% of all AM stations in America were forced to change frequencies.

At its founding, WHIO was an NBC Red Network affiliate, also taking some shows from the NBC Blue Network. But in the 1940s, WHIO switched to the CBS Radio Network. Then, as network programming moved from radio to television, WHIO switched to a full service middle of the road format of popular music, news and sports.

In 1946, Cox Radio added an FM station, 99.1 WHIO-FM.  At first, WHIO-FM simulcast the AM station.  But in the 1960s, it began airing a beautiful music format.  And in 1989, it became WHKO with a country music format. In 1949, Cox added a TV station, WHIO-TV on Channel 13 (later on Channel 7).  Because WHIO had been an CBS affiliate, WHIO-TV also began airing CBS Television programs.

WHIO's long history in the market included Lou Emm. Emm was a popular host of variety shows, live remote broadcasts and station promotions.  He started at WHIO in the early 1940s and retired in 1992. When Emm died a few years later, all Dayton radio stations paused for a moment of silence.

Phil Donahue started at WHIO as the host of the weekday talk show "Conversation Piece" in the 1960s before his move to television and competitor Channel 2 WLWD (now WDTN) in 1967. His show became nationally syndicated beginning in 1970.  During this era, Winston Hoehner was news director at WHIO for 25 years and was a member of the Ohio Associated Press Broadcast Journalism Hall of Fame. He died in 1990.

WHIO was the originating station of a regional news network in the 1960s and '70s which was aired late afternoons on stations in surrounding communities throughout the Miami Valley as "The DP&L News Network" (named for its sponsor, The Dayton Power and Light Company). A similar network aired in the 1990s during this same time frame as "The Newscenter 7 Radio Network."

On October 30, 2006, Cox Radio pulled the plug on the all-1980 hits format on WDPT "95.7 The Point."  The station switched to a simulcast of WHIO's News/Talk format. 95.7 WHIO-FM has an effective radiated power of 50,000 watts and covers much of south central Ohio, also reaching into Eastern Indiana.   The simulcast gives listeners the choice of hearing WHIO on either FM or AM.

Programming
WHIO-FM personality Larry Hansgen hosts the morning-drive program, Miami Valley's Morning News. Brian Kilmeade's late-morning program, produced by Fox News Talk and distributed by Westwood One, airs in late mornings. The Mark Kaye Show (based at WOKV-FM) and The Sean Hannity Show (via Premiere Networks) airs in middays and afternoons. Local show The Evening Edge with Todd Hollst 6-8pm, and Dana Loesch air in the evening hours, respectively. Coast to Coast AM (via Premiere) airs in the overnight hours.

WHIO-FM also serves as the radio home for University of Dayton Flyers football and basketball.

References

External links

 

FCC History Cards for WHIO

HIO
News and talk radio stations in the United States
Radio stations established in 1935
Cox Media Group
1935 establishments in Ohio